Orangemen or Orangewomen can refer to:

Historically, supporters of William of Orange
Members of the modern Orange Order (also known as Orange Institution), a Protestant fraternal organisation
Members or supporters of the Armagh GAA Gaelic football team
The former name of the sports teams of Syracuse University, now called the Syracuse Orange
The elite cheering group of the Seattle Pacific University men's basketball team

See also
Orange People (disambiguation)